Jill Sobule (born January 16, 1959) is an American singer-songwriter best known for the 1995 single "I Kissed a Girl", and "Supermodel" from the soundtrack of the 1995 film Clueless. Her folk-inflected compositions alternate between ironic, story-driven character studies and emotive ballads, a duality reminiscent of such 1970s American songwriters as Warren Zevon, Harry Nilsson, Loudon Wainwright III, Harry Chapin, and Randy Newman. Autobiographical elements, including Sobule's Jewish heritage and her adolescent battles with anorexia and depression, frequently occur in Sobule's writing.

In 2009, she released California Years, an album funded entirely by fan donations, making her an early pioneer of crowdfunding. Since 2020, she has acted as musician-in-residence at the Bayard Rustin Center for Social Justice, an LGBTQIA community center.

History and studio recordings

To date Sobule has released eight studio albums of original songs, four EPs, and a greatest hits compilation album. Sobule's output also includes original songs available only via the Internet, a cover of Robert Earl Keen's Christmas novelty track "Merry Christmas from the Family," and a version of the late Warren Zevon's "Don't Let Us Get Sick" included on both Sobule's acoustic album and on a posthumous Zevon tribute record.

1990s
Sobule's debut album Things Here Are Different was released in 1990. Produced by pop legend Todd Rundgren, the album failed to sell. During this period a follow-up record was produced by British New Wave rocker Joe Jackson (for whom she opened during 1991) but Sobule was dropped from her label and the second record was never released. It was five years before Sobule landed another recording contract.

Her 1995 album Jill Sobule established Sobule as part of a fruitful mid-90s movement of female singer-songwriters that included such artists as Lisa Loeb, Juliana Hatfield and Alanis Morissette. The album contains Sobule's best-known composition "I Kissed a Girl", a story-song about a lesbian flirtation between two suburban girlfriends which became an unlikely radio success thanks in part to a comedic music video featuring beefcake model Fabio. "Supermodel" (sample lyric: "I didn't eat yesterday ... and I'm not gonna eat today ... and I'm not gonna eat tomorrow ... 'Cause I'm gonna be a supermodel") managed to both send up and celebrate American teenage lifestyles, and became well known after its inclusion in 1995's hit teen comedy film Clueless.

The Jill Sobule album seemed to establish Sobule's commercial prospects, but her third album slowed that momentum while setting what has so far been the musical and production patterns for the rest of her career. 1997's Happy Town featured Sobule's most elaborate pop productions to date and contains songs about an eclectic range of topics including reactionary Christianity ("Soldiers of Christ"), the negative impact of anti-depressant medication on the libido ("Happy Town"), and a track that uses Anne Frank's enforced Nazi-era hibernation as the metaphor for a love song ("Attic"). Though embraced by record reviewers from publications as diverse as The Advocate and Entertainment Weekly, Happy Town sold poorly, simultaneously solidifying Sobule's critical reputation while stalling her commercial momentum.

2000s
The 2000 record Pink Pearl may be Sobule's most characteristic set. Anchored by the female character studies "Lucy at the Gym" (about an anorexic exercise addict), "Claire" (about an aging lesbian aviator succumbing to Alzheimer's disease) and "Mary Kay" about Mary Kay Letourneau, the notorious real-life schoolteacher who became impregnated and imprisoned as the result of the statutory rape of a 13-year-old male student, whom she married when he reached the age of consent. Pink Pearl also contains some of Sobule's most directly confessional songwriting, especially the atheist's prayer "Somewhere in New Mexico" and the insomniac's lullaby "Rock Me To Sleep". Don Henley contributed a promotional quotation to the ad campaign for the album and selected Sobule to open for him during his solo tour that year.

In 2004, Sobule self-released an independent album of demo-quality acoustic tracks titled The Folk Years 2003–2003. In addition to some of her rarer compositions and several tracks that would later receive fuller arrangements on Sobule's next major-label release, Sobule performed offbeat cover versions of such standards as the old Doris Day theme song "Que Sera Sera" and "Sunrise/Sunset" from the Broadway musical Fiddler on the Roof.

2004's more elaborately recorded Underdog Victorious was one of the last albums distributed by legendary personal manager and media entrepreneur Danny Goldberg's now-defunct Artemis Records. The liquidation of Artemis Records led Sobule to extend her experiments with online music distribution and to relocate from New York City to Los Angeles. In Los Angeles, she has continued to write and perform prolifically and to compose original music for television, including for the popular Nickelodeon series Unfabulous.

In mid-January 2008, Sobule launched a website, jillsnextrecord.com, which sought to raise $75,000 through fan donations in order to produce, manufacture, distribute and promote an upcoming studio album. In exchange for their donations, Sobule offered her patrons an assortment of gifts with values commensurate with the amount of the donation. These gifts ranged from a free download of the album upon its release ($10) to the opportunity to attend a recording session and sing on the record ($10,000).

On March 8, 2008, 53 days after the public launch of the site, Sobule reached her target through donations from over 500 people in 44 U.S. states, the District of Columbia, and eleven foreign countries. The subsequent album, California Years, was released on April 14, 2009 on Sobule's own label, Pinko Records.

Sobule released "Dottie's Charms" in 2014, in which she put music to lyrics of her friends and favorite authors including David Hajdu, Jonathan Lethem, Vendela Vida, and Lucy Sante.

In 2018, Sobule once again used crowd funding to assist with the production of her next album, "Nostalgia Kills". Rolling Stone listed Sobule's first single from the album, "Island of Lost Things", as one of the 'best country & americana songs you need to hear right now'.

Music

Sobule uses both satire and personal experience to sing about a range of issues, including sexuality, depression, war, abandonment, and greed. According to her website bio, a central preoccupation of her work is the classic one: "Love found, love lost, love wished for and love taken away." Many of her songs incorporate humor into their narrative. She often creates detailed character sketches, especially of women.

Collaborations
Sobule is a prolific collaborator, writing and performing both with other musicians and with artists from nonmusical disciplines, including blogger Arianna Huffington, television producer Sue Rose and comedian Julia Sweeney.

In the late 90s, Sobule toured with Richard Barone as "The Richard & Jill Show". Together they wrote "Bitter" on Happy Town, "Rock Me To Sleep" on Pink Pearl, "Big Shoes" on I Never Learned to Swim, and "Waiting for the Train" on Barone's Clouds Over Eden album. They also appeared together (as Mr. and Mrs. Sobule) in the underground film Next Year in Jerusalem, which featured another of their compositions, "Everybody's Queer". The pair continue to collaborate, including "Odd Girl Out" for Barone's 2010 album, Glow (Bar/None Records), and to perform together. Their songs have been used on The West Wing. Felicity, Dawson's Creek, South of Nowhere and other television shows. In 2018, Barone produced and sang backing vocals on "Island of Lost Things" on Sobule's album Nostalgia Kills.

In 1997-1998, Sobule joined Lloyd Cole's short-lived band The Negatives.

In 2004, she played one of the five leads in the film Mind The Gap with six of her songs featured on the soundtrack.

In 2005, Sobule contributed music to Unfabulous, a popular Nickelodeon TV series about a 13-year-old aspiring songwriter, including a title song performed by Sobule under the program's opening credits. Four Sobule compositions or co-compositions appear on the series star's debut album, Unfabulous and More: Emma Roberts: credits a Roberts cover version of "Mexican Wrestler" from Sobule's album Pink Pearl; "Punch Rocker" and "94 Weeks (Metal Mouth Freak)," both written by Sobule for Roberts' character to "compose" on the program; and "New Shoes," a track co-written by Sobule with Unfabulous series creator Sue Rose.

In 2006, Sobule met Julia Sweeney, the actress, writer and comedian, and started performing the "Jill and Julia Show", a compilation of songs and stories. They performed at the James Randi Educational Foundation meeting in Las Vegas on January 19, 2007, as well as at regular showings for the Groundlings Theater in Los Angeles. Also in 2006, Sobule created a theme song for blogger Arianna Huffington's self-help book On Becoming Fearless.

In 2007, Sobule teamed up with John Doe to produce and record a cover of Neil Young's "Down by the River" for the American Laundromat Records benefit CD Cinnamon Girl – Women Artists Cover Neil Young For Charity. Other contributing artists included Lori McKenna, Tanya Donelly, Josie Cotton, Kristin Hersh, Britta Phillips, and The Watsons Twins.

Also in 2007, Sobule's song "San Francisco" became the first single released by Don Was as part of his Wasmopolitan Cavalcade of Recorded Music, an advertiser-sponsored means for the recording and distribution of new music, part of the multimedia website mydamnchannel.com. The pair also collaborated on a 16-minute concert video entitled "Jill Sobule's Dance Party," distributed for free in two parts on both mydamnchannel.com and YouTube.

In May 2008, Sobule released a CD of music from Prozak and the Platypus, a multi-media collaboration of Sobule, playwright Elise Thoron, and graphic artist KellyAnne Hanrahan. The play, written by Thoron (book, lyrics) and Sobule (music) and illustrated in a graphic novella by Hanrahan, tells the story of a fierce young woman, Sara (a musician) and her father Arvin, a neuroscientist, who relocates his family from Los Angeles to Brisbane, Australia to study REM sleep in the platypus, a unique species native to Australia. Shattered by her mother's recent suicide and unhappy with the side-effects of her own treatment for depression, Sara renames herself "Prozak," rages through her songwriting, and rebels. Meanwhile, in her father's lab, Sara finds an unexpected confidant in her father's current lab subject, a jaunty platypus who speaks to her and calls himself "Frankie". In the piece, according to its website, "Music club and science lab become testing grounds in which angry teen and scientist father pit aboriginal mythology against modern neuroscience research. The dreams of a platypus prove to be the link between the two."

Sobule was a frequent guest on National Public Radio's The Bryant Park Project. Her contributions took the form of musical essays offering commentary on contemporary issues, including record-financing in the music industry, the 2007 Writers Guild strike, and the popularity of tarty, uncreative Halloween costumes. Sobule toured twice with the late Warren Zevon, with whom she shares a penchant for sardonic storytelling. The two artists frequently accompanied one another during each other's sets, and Zevon was known on multiple occasions to take the lead vocal on Sobule's "I Kissed a Girl". Sobule has said that part of their bond came from the fact that she, like Zevon, was best known for a single fluke hit (Zevon's being "Werewolves of London").

In 2009-10, Sobule performed with Julia Sweeney in a revue called "Jill and Julia".  Sobule and Sweeney originally met at a TED (conference) and performed together at TED in 2008. They brought the show on the road
in 2009 and 2010, performing in New York and Denver among other locations.  The show is an autobiographical mix of music, stories and commentary.

Katy Perry's "I Kissed a Girl"
In 2008, Katy Perry issued her own "I Kissed a Girl" for her debut album One of the Boys. The song received mixed reviews but skyrocketed to #1. 
Sobule shared her feelings about Perry's song and use of the title in a July 2009 interview with The Rumpus:

Days later, in an article she wrote for The Huffington Post, Sobule stated:

Personal life
Sobule identifies as bisexual.

Discography

Studio albums
Things Here Are Different (1990)
Jill Sobule (1995)
Happy Town (1997) – AUS No. 83
Pink Pearl (2000)
The Folk Years 2003–2003 (2004)
Underdog Victorious (2004)
Jill Sobule Sings Prozak and the Platypus (2008)
California Years (2009)
Dottie's Charms (2014)
Nostalgia Kills (2018)

Live albums
Live at Joe's Pub 2008 (2008)
A Day at the Pass (2011)

DVD
Live in Pittsburgh (2003)

Compilations
I Never Learned to Swim: Jill Sobule 1990–2000 (2001)

EPs
Jill's Holiday Songs 2000 (2000)
It's the Thought That Counts (2001) – re-issued in 2005
Be Mine... Please (2001)
It's the Thought That Counts (2005)
The Pinko Record Junior Executive EP (2012)

Singles

Soundtrack appearances
1987: "There is More to Love" from  Mind Killer
1995: "Supermodel"  from  Clueless
1996: "Where Do I Begin"  from  The Truth About Cats & Dogs
1996: "Truth Is You Lied"  from  Grace of My Heart
1996: "The Secretive Life"  from  Harriet the Spy
1999: "Rainy Day Parade"  from Mystery Men
2003: "Tel Aviv," "Nothing Natural," "Bitter," "Somewhere in New Mexico," "Freshman," and "Vrbana Bridge" from  Mind the Gap
2005: "Love Is Never Equal" from Jenny McCarthy's Dirty Love

Various artist compilations
1992: "Too Cool to Fall in Love" from An Elpee's Worth of Productions
1995: "The Jig Is Up" from Grooves: Volume 8
1995: "Good Person Inside" and "The Man in the Boat"  from Spew
1995: "Merry Christmas from the Family" from You Sleigh Me
1997: "Stoned Soul Picnic" from Time and Love: The Music of Laura Nyro
1997: "I Will Survive" from In Their Own Words and from Hard Rock Live
1998: "Saddest Day of the Year" from A Christmas to Remember
1999: "Just a Little Lovin'" from Forever Dusty
1999: "Sunrise, Sunset" from Knitting on the Roof
2000: "Rainy Day Parade" from New Talent Spotlight Volume 2
2000: "I Kissed a Girl" from K-TEL Pop Alternative
2004: "Don't Let Us Get Sick" from Enjoy Every Sandwich: The Songs of Warren Zevon
2007: "Down by the River" with John Doe from Cinnamon Girl – Women Artists Cover Neil Young For Charity

B-sides
1995: "Queen of Spades" (from the "Supermodel" single)
1997: "Loveless Motel" (from the "Bitter" single, later included on the album Pink Pearl)
2000: "Lucy at the Gym" (from the "When My Ship Comes In" single, later included on the album Pink Pearl)
2004: "Almost Fell" (bonus track on the Borders edition of Underdog Victorious)

Other
Clouds Over Eden (1994) – Richard Barone
Glow (2010) - Richard Barone
The Negatives (2000) – Lloyd Cole and The Negatives
Unfabulous – TV show soundtrack
So Jill – Tribute song written & performed by Jane Wiedlin, Lloyd Cole & Charlotte Caffey
Lumberjill (2019) – Song written and performed for The Simpsons episode “Marge the Lumberjill”.

References

External links

Jill Sobule's Blog on The Huffington Post
March 2008 Interview @ feeltheword.net 
Prozak and the Platypus site
Audio interview with Erin McKeown and Jill Sobule on Well-Rounded Radio, 2009

Living people
1961 births
American folk-pop singers
American women bloggers
American bloggers
American women singer-songwriters
Bisexual musicians
Bisexual women
LGBT Jews
Jewish American musicians
Musicians from Denver
American LGBT singers
21st-century American women
21st-century American Jews
Singer-songwriters from Colorado